John Joseph Salisse   (24 March 1926, Bournemouth − 26 September 2006, Hampstead, London) was a director of Marks & Spencer from 1968 to 1985. He was also a magician and author, who served The Magic Circle as their Honorary Secretary and Vice-President.

References

1926 births
2006 deaths
Marks & Spencer people
Commanders of the Order of the British Empire
Businesspeople from Bournemouth
English magicians
Academy of Magical Arts Special Fellowship winners